Eduardo Enrique Fereira Peñaranda (born 29 September 2000) is a Venezuelan professional footballer player who plays as defender for portuguese club Casa Pia.

References

2000 births
Living people
Venezuelan footballers
Venezuela youth international footballers
Venezuelan Primera División players
Caracas FC players
Association football defenders
Sportspeople from Valencia, Venezuela
21st-century Venezuelan people